Nicolò Pacassi (5 March 1716 – 11 November 1790), also known as Nikolaus Pacassi, was an Italian-Austrian architect. He was born in Wiener Neustadt in Lower Austria in a family of merchants from Gorizia. In 1753, he was appointed court architect to Maria Theresa of Austria. He was commissioned many works throughout the Austrian Empire, mainly in Vienna, Prague, Innsbruck, Buda and his native Gorizia and Gradisca. He died in Vienna.

Works
 1743 extension of Schloss Hetzendorf
 1745–47 extension of Schönbrunn Palace including Schlosstheater Schönbrunn
 1749–58 Buda Castle
 1753–54 extension of Spanish Hall of Prague Castle
 1753–75 Royal Palace of Prague Castle
 1761–63 Rebuilt the Theater am Kärntnertor, Vienna (illustration)
 1770 Reconstruction of Prague's cathedral St Vitus' tower
 1766 Extension of Ballhausplatz
 Palazzo Attems Petzenstein in Gorizia
 1784 Josephinum - designed as the Academy for Military Surgeons, sponsored by Emperor Joseph II

References 

Architects from Vienna
Austrian people of Italian descent
People from Wiener Neustadt
People from Gorizia
1716 births
1790 deaths